Polyceratocarpus scheffleri is a species of plant in the Annonaceae family. It is endemic to Tanzania.

References

Flora of Tanzania
Annonaceae
Vulnerable plants
Taxonomy articles created by Polbot